180 is a 2011 Indian romantic drama film directed by Jayendra Panchapakesan who co-wrote the film with Subha and Umarji Anuradha. The film was shot simultaneously in Telugu and Tamil, the latter titled  Nootrenbadhu. It stars Siddharth, Priya Anand and Nithya Menen (in her Tamil debut) with notable roles being played by Moulee, Tanikella Bharani and Geetha among others.

Nootrenbadhu marks Siddharth's comeback to Tamil cinema after seven years; his last Tamil outing being Aayutha Ezhuthu (2004). The film was shot on a Red One camera. Produced by SPI Cinemas and Aghal Films, the film's Tamil version was distributed by Ayngaran International. The music was composed by Sharreth, with cinematography handled by Balasubramaniem and editing work done by Kishore Te. The film was released on 25 June 2011.

Plot
Dr. Ajay "AJ" Kumar (Siddharth) comes to Hyderabad (Chennai in the Tamil version) and introduces himself as Mano. He rents a house owned by elderly couple S. V. S. Murthy (T. S. B. K. Moulee) and Jayam (Geetha). A do-gooder, Ajay lives life with a purpose. He gets along with everyone and wins the hearts of those whom he is close with. D. "Vidya" Vidyalakshmi (Nithya Menen), a newspaper photojournalist, gets acquainted with him. Ajay is the sort of person who finds satisfaction in helping others. He sponsors the education of street children with the help of Vidya, who is attracted by his good nature. Things take a turn when she tells him about her feelings. Ajay, without informing her, decides to leave the city. Meanwhile, a flashback reveals that Ajay was a doctor in San Francisco, where he meets Renuka "Renu" Narayanan (Priya Anand), an interior designer. They get married only to be told months later that Ajay has pancreatic cancer and has about six months left - hence the title 180 (180 days). As Ajay is about to leave Chennai, Vidya meets with an accident and has to be operated upon. Ajay takes Vidya to San Francisco for treatment. While in San Francisco, he meets his friend RJ "Sam" Sambasivam (Sricharan) who asks him to meet Renu, but Ajay leaves as he sees her life happier without him. It is revealed that Ajay had faked his death to make Renu believe that he had died so that she would not suffer thinking about him every day. Now seeing her content, he decides not to meet Renu. He misses his flight to India and goes to Brazil instead. Now in Rio de Janeiro, he goes by the name Jose. He is seen playing football, waiting for his death.

Cast

 Siddharth as Dr. Ajay "AJ" Kumar alias Mano & José, a doctor in San Francisco. He goes by Mano when he visits Chennai (Tamil)/Hydrabad (Telugu) and José in Rio de Janeiro.
 Priya Anand as Renuka "Renu" Narayanan, an interior designer in San Francisco. She and AJ met at his hospital and got married shortly afterward.
 Nithya Menen as D. "Vidya" Vidyalakshmi, a photojournalist in Chennai (Tamil)/Hyderabad (Telugu). She meets Mano when she visits India.
 T. S. B. K. Moulee as S. V. S. Murthy
 Geetha as Jayam, Murthy's wife.
 Sricharan as RJ "Sam" Sambasivam, an RJ in San Francisco who is Ajay's friend.
 Misha Ghoshal as Julie, Vidya's friend and roommate in Chennai (Tamil)/Hyderabad (Telugu).
 Lakshmi Ramakrishnan as Ajay's mother.
 Tanikella Bharani as Narayanan, Renu's father.
 Janaki Sabesh as Annalakshmi (Tamil)/ Annapurna (Telugu), Renu's mother.
 M. S. Narayana as Vidya's boss in Chennai (Tamil)/Hyderabad (Telugu).
 Boys Rajan as Vidya's father
 Tushar Tharayil as Nandha

Production 
Advertisement film maker Jayendra announced his first feature film, as a bilingual on 15 June 2010 at AVM Studios in Vadapalani, Chennai; featuring Siddharth in the lead role, marking his return to Tamil cinema after seven years since Aaytha Ezhuthu (2004). Priya Anand and Nithya Menen were roped in to play the lead roles alongside Siddharth. This film marks Menen's Tamil debut. The film crew features Sharreth, Balasubramaniem and Kishore Te as the composer, cinematographer and editor respectively.

Filming took place on 15 June 2010, at the day on the launch, and shot in Chennai, Hyderabad and San Francisco; and was shot using Red Digital cinema camera. The film is titled as 180 but for Tamil version title was speculated to be Putham Pudhu Kadhali, before announcing the title as Nootrenbadhu, which means 180 in Tamil, in order to get tax-exemption.

Soundtrack

The soundtrack for 180 was composed by Malayalam composer Sharreth. The film was his third project in Tamil and second in Telugu. Think Music, a subsidiary of SPI Cinemas, the film's production company, acquired the music rights for both Tamil and Telugu versions. The album consists of 7 tracks, primarily performed by Malayalam playback singers, and also features an additional track "Continua" which was composed by Mani Sharma.

The film's Tamil version of the soundtrack album was released on 13 May 2011, at Sathyam Cinemas, with noted film director Mani Ratnam, cinematographer P. C. Sreeram being present along with actors Arya, Jayam Ravi and Shiva and the entire film crew. The audio of the Telugu version was launched on 28 May 2011 at Prasad Labs in Hyderabad, and the launching event was graced by actors Ram, Shruti Hassan, Sunil, producer Allu Aravind, Shyam Prasad Reddy, Daggubati Suresh Babu, director B. V. Nandini Reddy, among with the film's cast and crew. The audio CDs were released by D. Suresh Babu and Allu Aravind.

As an interesting experiment, Swaroop Reddy, the CEO of Think Music had launched an e-store for the audio label, where the tracks could be purchased for the price you quote, which is a new concept for Indian music industry. The songs were made available on the store, upon its release.

Critical response

The soundtrack received positive reviews. Pavithra Srinivasan of Rediff gave the album a score of three stars out of five and quoted "Sharreth seems to be a music composer who doesn't play by the rules; he veers this way and that in his songs, which actually provides spice and makes for an interesting listening experience. Nee Korinal and AJ make for pleasant listens, while the rest offer something out of the ordinary. Go for it." Behindwoods.com gave a rating of three and a half stars out of five and said that the album was "Novel and worth listening to", further citing: "The music arrangement is again different. Very situational, with right visuals, the song has good chances of making it big. Overall, Sharreth and Jayendra have gone full throttle in experimenting with music in 180'''s album. Such initiatives should be welcomed with both hands." Indiaglitz said: "The songs are new, refreshing and nice to listen to. Sharreth has ensured that he delivers with different sound, apparently to reach the target audience - the youngsters. Jayendra seems to have extracted what he wanted to from the music composer. The lyrics too are simple and catchy. A blend of new and seasoned singers gives solidity to the songs." Milliblog reviewed the soundtrack as "180 is unconventional in every way, right from the title to all its songs! Overall, an enchanting soundtrack from Sharreth!" MusicAloud rated the album 8.5/10, choosing "Sandhikkaatha Kangalil", "Nee Korinaal", "AJ", "Siru Siru Kanavugal" as their top picks, while stating a bottomline "One of Sharreth’s best works in recent times that sees him in fabulous touch. Hope he contributes an equally wonderful soundtrack to Malayalam soon."

Release
The film's first posters were released in Tamil and Telugu on 14 February 2011, coinciding with Valentine's Day. A formal press meet held at Sathyam Cinemas, Chennai on 30 March 2011, where the makers launched the film's official website. Theatrical trailer of the film's Tamil version was unveiled on 25 May 2011, and the Telugu version was released on 28 May 2011, during the film's audio launch event. It was unveiled by Ram, Shruti Hassan and producer Allu Aravind.

Initially, the film was scheduled to release on 20 May 2011, and pushed to 10 June 2011, but the makers finally announced that the film will be released on 25 June 2011, in both Tamil and Telugu versions.

The satellite rights of the film's Tamil version were sold to Jaya TV, and the Telugu version was sold to Gemini TV. The media rights include satellite rights and ringtones.

On 4 August 2011, Ayngaran International released the Tamil version of the movie on Blu-ray, DVD and VCD formats. The Telugu version was released by Volga Video on 15 September 2011.

 Reception 

Critical reception
 Nootrenbadhu 
Behindwoods.com gave two and a half out of five, claiming the film had "great visuals, wonderful colors, weak screenplay" further citing that "one gets a feeling that the screenplay, especially in second half might be the weakest link". CNN-IBN rated it two and a half, claiming that "Jayendra has made a stylish film using the essentials of an ad film" and that the film had come out as a "finely made film with some good performances without novelty or the gripping element". Pavithra Srinivasan of Rediff also gave two and a half out of five, concluding: "180 is a visual feast, no doubt about it. Sadly it falls prey to clichés and lagging pace". Sify.com noted the film was totally different from the "assembly line mass masalas that is flooding the screens" and "worth a look for its superior packaging with a touch of class". Karthik Subramaniam from The Hindu criticized that the film lacked is in its screenplay and narration, that the story failed to engage and that the pace was slow. He summarized that the film felt like a "present with more attention paid to the wrapper than what's inside". N. Venkateswaran from The Times of India gave two and a half stars out of five and said "The weakest link in the story/screenplay (by Jayendra and Subha) is the character of Dr Ajay Kumar – though he is shown to be a highly educated doctor, he loses the plot when he finds out that is suffering from pancreatic cancer". However, Rohit Ramachandran of Nowrunning.com rated it four out of five stars, stating that there was not "a flash of brilliance in Nootrenbadhu but instead, a big heart and an empathetic soul giving it honesty, meaning and eloquence", further citing it had "both high and low spirits but it tugs at your emotional chords mainly in the second half". He also hailed it as the best film of 2011.

 180 

Idlebrain.com gave three out of five and stated that the plus points of the film were "casting and technical aspects (cinematography, music and post-production). On the flip side, the narration of the film is very slow and the last half-an-hour of the film is a bit confusing". Daily News and Analysis gave one and a half and said: "180'' feels like there was an explosion at the sob story factory and little pieces from dozens of different films were jammed together into one dreadful mutant. The whole terminal illness melodrama attacks your chest so relentlessly, that by the time it's over you’re forced to beg for a defibrillator".

Box office
The film collected 8 million in Chennai in the first three days with theaters reporting around 90% occupancy. After two weeks, it collected 12 million with occupancy going up to 90%.

References

External links
 
 

Indian multilingual films
2011 romantic drama films
2011 films
2010s Tamil-language films
Indian romantic drama films
Indian films about cancer
Films scored by Sharreth
Films shot in Chennai
2011 multilingual films
2011 directorial debut films
2010s Telugu-language films
Films shot in Hyderabad, India